Pennsylvania Dutch (or ), sometimes referred to as Pennsylvania German, is a variety of Palatine German, also known as Palatine Dutch, spoken by the Pennsylvania Dutch: Old Order Amish, Old Order Mennonites, Fancy Dutch, and other descendants of German immigrants in the United States and Canada. There are possibly more than 300,000 native speakers of Pennsylvania Dutch in the United States and Canada.

It has traditionally been the dialect of the Pennsylvania Dutch, descendants of late 17th- and early to late 18th-century immigrants to Pennsylvania, Maryland, Virginia, West Virginia, and North Carolina primarily from Southern Germany and, less so, from the eastern France regions of Alsace and Lorraine, and parts of Switzerland. Although the term Pennsylvania Dutch is often taken to refer to the Amish and related Old Order groups, it does not imply a connection to any particular religious group.

The word Dutch does not refer to the Dutch language or people, but is derived from the endonym Deitsch. Ultimately, the terms Deitsch, Dutch, Diets and Deutsch are all descendants of the Proto-Germanic word , meaning "popular" or "of the people". The continued use of the term was strengthened by the Pennsylvania Dutch in the 19th century as a way of distinguishing themselves from later (post-1830) waves of German immigrants to the United States, with the Pennsylvania Dutch referring to themselves as Deitsche and to the new settlers as Deitschlenner (literally "Germany-ers'") whom they saw as a related but distinct group.

Speakers of the dialect today are primarily found in Pennsylvania, Ohio, Indiana, and other Midwestern states of the United States, and in Ontario in Canada. Historically, the dialect was also spoken in several other regions where its use has largely or entirely faded. The practice of Pennsylvania Dutch as a street language in urban areas of Pennsylvania, such as Allentown, Reading, Lancaster, and York, was declining by the arrival of the 20th century, but in more rural areas it continued in widespread use until World War II. Since that time, its use has greatly declined. It is best preserved in the Old Order Amish and Old Order Mennonite communities, and presently the members of both groups make up the majority of Pennsylvania Dutch speakers.

European origins 

The ancestors of Pennsylvania Dutch speakers came from various parts of the southwest corner of the German-speaking region of Europe, mainly the Palatinate, but also including the Electoral Palatinate, the Duchy of Baden, Hesse, Saxony, Swabia, Württemberg, Alsace (German ), German Lorraine, and Switzerland. Most of them spoke Rhine Franconian, especially Palatine German (Palatinate German) and to a lesser degree Alemannic dialects, and it is believed that in the first generations after the settlers arrived, the dialects merged. The result of that dialect levelling was a dialect very close to the eastern dialects of Palatine German, especially the rural dialects around Mannheim/Ludwigshafen.

Pennsylvania Dutch is mainly derived from Palatine German, spoken by 2,400,000 Germans in the Rhine-Neckar Metropolitan Region (a region almost identical to the historical Palatinate). There are many similarities between the German dialect that is still spoken in this small part of southwestern Germany and Pennsylvania Dutch. When individuals from the Palatinate (Pfalz) region of Germany today encounter Pennsylvania Dutch speakers, conversation is often possible to a limited degree.

Comparison with Standard German 
Pennsylvania Dutch for the most part does not reflect the diverse origins of the early speakers from regions along the upper Rhine River (Rhineland, Württemberg, Baden, Saarland, Switzerland and the Elsass/Alsace) but almost exclusively the strong immigrant group from the Palatine.

Pennsylvania Dutch is not a corrupted form of Standard German, since Standard German originally developed as a written standard based on the various spoken German dialects in a very long process that started in the time of classical Middle High German (1170–1250). Pennsylvania Dutch instead reflects the independent development of Palatine German, especially from the region that is called  in German.

Several vowels and consonants in Pennsylvania Dutch represent older forms of the German language ("p" instead of "pf" or "v" instead of "b"), since Pennsylvania Dutch is largely derived from Palatinate German, which did not undergo the High German consonant shift to the same extent that Standard German did. The correspondences between Standard German and Pennsylvania Dutch occur with a fair degree of regularity.

The American English influence is most significant on vocabulary and to a much lesser degree on pronunciation; the English influence on grammar is relatively small. The question of whether the large loss of the dative case — the most significant difference compared with Palatine German – is due to English influence or reflects an inner development is disputed.

Grammar 

As in Standard German, Pennsylvania Dutch uses three genders (masculine, feminine, and neuter).
Pennsylvania Dutch has three cases for personal pronouns: the accusative, nominative, and dative, and two cases for nouns: the common case, with both accusative and nominative functions, and the dative case.
There is no genitive case in Pennsylvania Dutch. The historical genitive case has been replaced by the dative, and possession is indicated with a special construction using the dative and the possessive pronoun: 'the man's dog' becomes  (literally: 'to the man his dog').
Studies have shown variability in the use of the dative case in both sectarian and non-sectarian communities. The trend is towards use of the common case for nouns and the accusative case for pronouns, instead of the dative.
Thus, for example, has frequently become .

The dative case in Pennsylvania German is used to express possession, to mark objects of prepositions, to mark indirect objects, and to indicate the direct objects of certain verbs. It is expressed, as in Standard German, through the use of dative forms of personal pronouns and through certain inflections of articles and adjectives modifying nouns. In non-sectarian speech in central Pennsylvania, the dative is widely used among the older generations who are fluent in Pennsylvania German, whereas younger semi-speakers tend not to use the dative as much. Many semi-speakers used the English possessive -'s.

In contrast, Anabaptists in central Pennsylvania had almost completely replaced the dative with the accusative case. Meanwhile, members of the entirely Pennsylvania Dutch-speaking community in Kalona, all of whom were Amish or Mennonite, showed strong age-related variation. Speakers under the age of 40 never used the dative, while older speakers showed strongly variable behavior. There was little difference between members of the different religious denominations in the Kalona.

Many verbs of English origin are used in Pennsylvania Dutch. Most English-origin verbs are treated as German weak verbs, receiving a past participle with a  prefix and a  suffix, thus for example the past participle of 'change' is usually . Verbs with unstressed first syllables generally do not take the  prefix, so the past participle of 'adopt' is adopted, as in English. This follows the pattern of words with inseparable prefixes in German. However, English-origin verbs which are stressed on the first syllable may also appear without the  prefix. Some German-origin verbs may also appear without the  prefix. Both English influence and overall simplification may be at work in the dropping of the  prefix.

Pennsylvania Dutch, like Standard German, has many separable verbs composed of a root verb and a prefix. Some of these in Standard German are completely semantically transparent, such as  'to go with', from  'with' and  'go'. Others, like   which means 'to inform' and not the sharing of concrete entities, are not semantically transparent. That is, their meaning is not the sum of their parts. Separable verbs are used widely in Pennsylvania Dutch, and separable verbs can even be formed with English roots and prefixes. Virtually all separable verbs in Pennsylvania Dutch are semantically transparent.

Adjectival endings exist but appear simplified compared to Standard German.

Several Pennsylvania Dutch grammars have been published over the years. Two examples are A Simple Grammar of Pennsylvania Dutch by J. William Frey and A Pennsylvania German Reader and Grammar by Earl C. Haag.

Pronunciation
The tables below appear to use IPA symbols to compare sounds used in Standard German (to the left) with sounds found to be their Pennsylvania Dutch equivalent. These sound correspondences do not mean that Pennsylvania Dutch pronunciation is derived from standard German pronunciation.

Vowels

Consonants

In Lancaster County, Pennsylvania, there have been numerous other shifts that can make their Pennsylvania Dutch particularly difficult for modern High German speakers to understand. A word beginning in  generally becomes , which is more easily pronounced, and so German  >  >  and German  >  > . Likewise, German  >  >  /tʃaɪt/. German  >  >  /tʃɹɪk/. The shift is rather common with German children learning to speak.

The softened  after guttural consonants has mixed with the guttural  of earlier generations and also turned into an American  and so German  >  >  and German  >  >  /tʃɹɪnt/. The changes in pronunciation, combined with the general disappearance of declensions as described above, result in a form of the dialect that has evolved somewhat from its early Pennsylvania origins nearly 300 years ago and is still rather easy to understand by German dialect speakers of the Rhineland-Palatinate area.

Interaction with English

The people from southern Germany, eastern France and Switzerland, where the Pennsylvania Dutch culture and dialect sprung, started to arrive in North America in the late 17th and the early 18th centuries, before the beginning of the Industrial Revolution. To a more limited extent, that is also true of a second wave of immigration in the mid-19th century, which came from the same regions, but settled more frequently in Ohio, Indiana, and other parts of the Midwest. Thus, an entire industrial vocabulary relating to electricity, machinery and modern farming implements has naturally been borrowed from the English. For Pennsylvania Dutch speakers who work in a modern trade or in an industrial environment, this could potentially increase the challenge of maintaining their mother tongue.

Numerous English words have been borrowed and adapted for use in Pennsylvania Dutch since the first generations of Pennsylvania German habitation of southeastern Pennsylvania. Today, many speakers will use Pennsylvania Dutch words for the smaller numerals and English for larger and more complicated numbers, like $27,599.

Conversely, although many among the earlier generations of Pennsylvania Dutch could speak English, they were known for speaking it with a strong and distinctive accent. Such Pennsylvania Dutch English can still sometimes be heard. Although the more-recently coined term is being used in the context of this and related articles to describe this Pennsylvania Dutch-influenced English, it has traditionally been referred to as "Dutchy" or "Dutchified" English.

Some features of Pennsylvania Dutch have diffused through Pennsylvania Dutch English to influence the general spoken English of eastern and central Pennsylvania. One notable example is a nonstandard handling of senses normally expressed with a present participle. In standard English, one would say "That needs fixing," but regional speakers who are not themselves Pennsylvania Dutch may produce a German-like "That needs fixed."

Written language 
Pennsylvania Dutch has primarily been a spoken dialect throughout its history, with very few of its speakers making much of an attempt to read or write it. Writing in Pennsylvania Dutch can be a difficult task, and there is no spelling standard for the dialect. There are currently two primary competing models upon  which numerous orthographic (i.e., spelling) systems have been based by individuals who attempt to write in the Pennsylvania Dutch dialect. One 'school' tends to follow the rules of American English orthography, the other the rules of Standard German orthography (developed by Preston Barba and Buffington). The choice of writing system is not meant to imply any difference in pronunciation. For comparison, a translation into Pennsylvania Dutch, using two spelling systems, of the Lord's Prayer, as found in the common traditional language English translation, is presented below. The text in the second column illustrates a system based on American English orthography. The text in the third column uses, on the other hand, a system based on Standard German. The English original is found in the first column, and a Standard German version appears in the fifth column. (Note: The German version(s) of the Lord's Prayer most likely to have been used by Pennsylvania Germans would have been derived in most cases from Martin Luther's translation of the New Testament.)

Publications 

Since 1997, the Pennsylvania Dutch newspaper Hiwwe wie Driwwe allows dialect authors (of whom there are still about 100) to publish Pennsylvania Dutch poetry and prose. Hiwwe wie Driwwe was founded by Michael Werner. It is published twice a year (2,400 copies per issue)—since 2013 in cooperation with the Pennsylvania German Cultural Heritage Center at Kutztown University. Since 2002, the newspaper is published both online and in print.

In 2006, the German publishing house Edition Tintenfaß started to print books in Pennsylvania Dutch.

In 2014, Jehovah's Witnesses began to publish literature in Pennsylvania Dutch.

Survival 
Pennsylvania Dutch, which is now in its fourth century on North American soil, had more than 250,000 speakers in 2012. It has shifted its center to the West with approximately 160,000 speakers in Ohio, Indiana, Wisconsin, Iowa and other Midwest states. There is even a small but growing number of Pennsylvania Dutch speakers in Upper Barton Creek and Springfield in Belize among Old Order Mennonites of the Noah Hoover group. The dialect is used vigorously by the horse and buggy Old Order Mennonites in the northern part of the Regional Municipality of Waterloo in Ontario, Canada.

Speakers without an Anabaptist background in general do not pass the dialect to their children today, but the Old Order Amish and horse-and-buggy Old Order Mennonites do so in the current generation, and there are no signs that the practice will end in the future. There are only two car driving Anabaptist groups who have preserved the dialect: The Old Beachy Amish and the Kauffman Amish Mennonites, also called Sleeping Preacher Churches. Even though Amish and Old Order Mennonites were originally a minority group within the Pennsylvania Dutch-speaking population, today they form the vast majority. According to sociologist John A. Hostetler, less than 10 percent of the original Pennsylvania Dutch population was Amish or Mennonite.

As of 1989, non-sectarian, or non-Amish and non-Mennonite, native Pennsylvania-Dutch speaking parents have generally spoken to their children exclusively in English. The reasons they cited were preventing their children from developing a "Dutch" accent and preparing them for school. Older speakers generally did not see a reason for young people to speak it. Many of their children learned the language from hearing their parents using it and from interactions with the generation older than their parents. Among the first natively English speaking generation, oldest siblings typically speak Pennsylvania Dutch better than younger ones. 

There have been efforts to advance the use of the dialect. Kutztown University offers a complete minor program in Pennsylvania German Studies. The program includes two full semesters of the Pennsylvania Dutch dialect. In the 2007–2008 school year, the classes were being taught by Professor Edward Quinter. In 2008–2009, Professor Robert Lusch served as the instructor.

According to one scholar, "today, almost all Amish are functionally bilingual in Pennsylvania Dutch and English; however, domains of usage are sharply separated. Pennsylvania Dutch dominates in most in-group settings, such as the dinner table and preaching in church services. In contrast, English is used for most reading and writing. English is also the medium of instruction in schools and is used in business transactions and often, out of politeness, in situations involving interactions with non-Amish. Finally, the Amish read prayers and sing in Standard, or High, German at church services. The distinctive use of three different languages serves as a powerful conveyor of Amish identity." Although "the English language is being used in more and more situations," nonetheless Pennsylvania Dutch is "one of a handful of minority languages in the United States that is neither endangered nor supported by continual arrivals of immigrants."

Because it is an isolated dialect and almost all native speakers are bilingual in English, the biggest threat to the dialect is gradual decay of the traditional vocabulary, which is then replaced by English loan words or words corrupted from English.

Speaker population 

In the United States, most Old Order Amish and all "horse and buggy" Old Order Mennonite groups speak Pennsylvania Dutch, except the Old Order Mennonites of Virginia, where German was already mostly replaced at the end of the 19th century. There are several Old Order Amish communities (especially in Indiana) where Bernese German, a form of Swiss German and Low Alemannic Alsatian, not Pennsylvania Dutch, are spoken. Additionally, English has mostly replaced Pennsylvania Dutch among the car driving Old Order Horning and the Wisler Mennonites.

Other religious groups among whose members the Pennsylvania Dutch dialect would have once been predominant, include: Lutheran and German Reformed congregations of Pennsylvania Dutch background, Schwenkfelders, and Schwarzenau (German Baptist) Brethren. Until fairly recent times, the speaking of Pennsylvania Dutch had absolutely no religious connotations.

In Ontario, Canada, the Old Order Amish, the members of the Ontario Old Order Mennonite Conference, the David Martin Old Order Mennonites, the Orthodox Mennonites and smaller pockets of others (regardless of religious affiliation) speak Pennsylvania Dutch. The members of the car driving Old Order Markham-Waterloo Mennonite Conference have mostly switched to English. In 2017, there were about 10,000 speakers of Pennsylvania Dutch in Canada, far fewer than in the United States.

There are also attempts being made in a few communities to teach the dialect in a classroom setting; however, as every year passes by, fewer and fewer in those particular communities speak the dialect. There is still a weekly radio program in the dialect whose audience is made up mostly of the diverse groups, and many Lutheran and Reformed congregations in Pennsylvania that formerly used German have a yearly service in Pennsylvania Dutch. Other non-native speakers of the dialect include those persons that regularly do business with native speakers.

Among them, the Old Order Amish population was probably around 227,000 in 2008. Additionally, the Old Order Mennonite population, a sizable percentage of which is Pennsylvania Dutch-speaking, numbers several tens of thousands. There are also thousands of other Mennonites who speak the dialect, as well as thousands more older Pennsylvania Dutch speakers of non-Amish and non-Mennonite background. The Grundsau Lodge, which is an organization in southeastern Pennsylvania of Pennsylvania Dutch speakers, is said to have 6,000 members. Therefore, a fair estimate of the speaker population in 2008 might be close to 300,000, although many, including some academic publications, may report much lower numbers, uninformed of those diverse speaker groups.

There are no formal statistics on the size of the Amish population, and most who speak Pennsylvania Dutch on the Canadian and U.S. censuses would report that they speak German, since it is the closest option available. Pennsylvania Dutch was reported under ethnicity in the 2000 census.

There are also some Pennsylvania Dutch speakers who belong to traditional Anabaptist groups in Latin America. Even though most Mennonite communities in Belize speak Plautdietsch, some few hundreds who came to Belize mostly around 1970 and who belong to the Noah Hoover Mennonites speak Pennsylvania Dutch. There are also some recent New Order Amish immigrants in Bolivia, Argentina, and Belize who speak Pennsylvania Dutch while the great majority of conservative Mennionites in those countries speak Plautdietsch.

Examples 

In Mario Pei's book Language, a popular poem in the dialect (with significant English influence in the form of loanwords) is printed; the free-translation is, in the main, by J. Cooper.

More example of spoken Pennsylvania Dutch can be found at the page "American Languages – our nation's many languages online" of the University of Wisconsin.

An example of a Pennsylvania Dutch song is "" ('My father and mother are German'), here sung by John Schmid.

In popular culture 
The Office character Dwight Schrute and his family, including his cousin Mose, are known to be Pennsylvania Dutch. Nevertheless, in the series Dwight speaks High German rather than the Pennsylvania dialect.

Orange is the New Black character Leanne Taylor and family are featured speaking Pennsylvania Dutch in flashbacks showing her Amish background before ending up in prison.

Science-fiction writer Michael Flynn wrote the novella The Forest of Time, depicting an alternate history in which the United States was never established, but each of the Thirteen Colonies went its own way as an independent nation. In that history, Pennsylvania adopted the Pennsylvania Dutch language as its national language and developed into a German-speaking nation, with its own specific culture, very distinct from both its English speaking neighbors and European Germany.

Pennsylvania German authors and translators 
Preston Barba
C. Richard Beam
John Birmelin
David B. Brunner
Solomon DeLong
Moses Dissinger
Richard Druckenbrod
H. L. Fischer
Arthur D. Graeff
Ezra Light Grumbine
Lee Light Grumbine
Earl C. Haag
Henry Harbaugh
Abraham R. Horne
Harry Hess Reichard
Clarence G. Reitnauer
Emmanuel Rondthaler
G. Gilbert Snyder
Pierce E. Swope
William S. Troxell
Louise Adeline Weitzel
Dr. Michael Werner
Louis August Wollenweber
Astor C. Wuchter
Thomas C. Zimmerman

See also 

 German-Pennsylvanian Association
 Pennsylvania Dutch Country
 Hutterite German
 Languages in the United States
 Wisconsin German
 Texas German
 Kurrent handwriting
 Assabe and Sabina
 Jersey Dutch
 Hunsrik language

Notes

References

Further reading
 Keiser, Steven Hartman. Pennsylvania German in the American Midwest (Duke University Press, 2012), 197 pp. online review
Richard Druckenbrod, Mir Schwetz Deitsch: A Guide for Learning the Skills of Reading, Writing and Speaking Pennsylvania German (1977)
Richard Druckenbrod, Mir Lanne Deitsch: A Guide for Learning the Skills of Reading, Writing and Speaking Pennsylvania German (1981, 1997)
Otto Springer, A Working Bibliography for the Study of the Pennsylvania German Language and Its Sources digitized and hyperlinked by Richard Mammana 2017—

External links 

Organizations
 German Society of Pennsylvania
 The Pennsylvania German Society
 Deutsch-Pennsylvanischer Arbeitskreis / German-Pennsylvanian Association

Pennsylvania German
 Hiwwe wie Driwwe – The Pennsylvania German Newspaper

Further information
 Recordings of native speakers
 Pennsylvania German in non-Amish, non-Mennonite communities
 From the Global Anabaptist Mennonite Encyclopedia Online
 Possible explanations for the confusion of names

 
Central German languages
German dialects
Diaspora languages
Fusional languages
German-Canadian culture in Ontario
German-American culture in Indiana
German-American culture in Ohio
German-American culture in Pennsylvania
German-American history
Amish in Canada
Amish in the United States
History of Pennsylvania
Languages of Canada
Christian liturgical languages